The Eastern Theater Command is one of the five theater commands of the People's Liberation Army (PLA), founded 1 February 2016. It replaced the Nanjing Military Region. The command is headquartered in Nanjing.

Its jurisdiction includes Jiangsu, Zhejiang, Anhui, Fujian, Jiangxi, Shanghai provinces and the East China Sea to include the Strait of Taiwan. The Eastern Theater Command is primarily composed three subordinate single-service component commands: the Eastern Theater Army of the PLAGF, the East Sea Fleet of the PLAN, and the Eastern Theater Command Air Force of the PLAAF which conduct combat operations within the command's area of responsibility. Also under the Eastern Theater Command is the Wuxi Joint Logistics Support Center (JSLC) of the CMC's Joint Logistics Support Force which provides logistic and material support to the command and Base 61 of the PLARF which is responsible for missile employment in the Eastern Theater.

Its commander is General Lin Xiangyang and its political commissar is General He Ping.

Area of responsibility
Eastern Theater Command's area of responsibility (AOR) includes East China, the East China Sea, and the Taiwan Strait. The command's primary missions are maintaining security in the East China Sea and the conduct of major operations against Taiwan, including the Penghu, Kinmen and Matsu Islands. It is also likely responsible for matters relating to Japan, including the Ryukyu Archipelago, the Tsushima Strait and the disputed Senkaku Islands.

History 
On 1 February 2016, the Eastern Theater Command held its inaugural meeting in the Bayi Building in Beijing. The meeting was held concurrently with all of the other newly created theater commands. General Secretary of the CCP and Chairman of the CMC Xi Jinping was in attendance, awarding military flags and issuing the official instructions. CMC Vice Chairman and CCP Politburo Member Fan Changlong read out the orders while CMC Vice Chairman Xu Qiliang presided.

In response to the 2022 visit by United States Speaker of the House Nancy Pelosi to Taiwan, the Eastern Theater Command conducted joint ground, air, and naval military exercises including live-fire drills, missile launches over Taipei, and Taiwanese Air Defense Identification Zone (ADIZ) incursions.

Organizational structure 
The Eastern Theater Command, like other Chinese theater commands, consists of a joint headquarters, a joint logistics support center (JSLC) from the PLA Joint Logistics Support Force, a PLA Ground Force (PLAGF) service component, a PLA Air Force (PLAAF) service component, a PLA Navy (PLAN) service component, and a PLA Rocket Force (PLARF) service component. Within Eastern Theater Command these units these are the Nanjing headquarters, Wuxi Joint Logistics Support Facility, Eastern Theater Command Ground Forces, Eastern Theater Command Air Force, Eastern Fleet, and Base 61.

Headquarters 
Located in Nanjing, capital of Jiangsu Province, the Eastern Theater Command headquarters includes both the General Staff Department, responsible for staff support to command leadership, and the Political Works Department, providing the Chinese Communist Party (CCP) oversight and influence within the command. The command's General Staff Department consists of at least eight sections: combat bureau, intelligence bureau, information assurance agency, military demand bureau, joint training board, mobilization bureau, work department bureau, work direction bureau, and war service bureau. The command's Political Works Department consists of at least six bureaus: general, organization, cadre, military and civilian, publicity, and group workers liaison bureau.

PLA Ground Force 

The PLA Ground Force (PLAGF) component of Eastern Theater Command is comprised of three major units: The 71st, 72nd, and 73rd Group Army. Since 2017 reforms, the PLAGF group army represents a more evolved, flexible, and capable operational organization that provides Chinese military decision makers with the ability to task-organize forces to accomplish specific missions. Each group army doctrinally commands twelve brigades: six combined-arms brigades (CA-BDEs) and six support brigades including aviation, artillery, air defense, CBRN, special operations forces (SOF), and others.

71st Group Army 
The 71st Group Army traces its history back to the 12th Crops, a February 1949 consolidation of the 34th, 35th, and 36th Divisions. In December of 1950, the 12th Corps incorporated the 31st Division of the 11th Corps and entered the Korean War, fighting in the Shangganling Campaign against two United Nations divisions. In May of 1989, the Central Military Commission mobilized at least 14 of the PLA's 24 group armies to enforce martial law against student-led protests in Tiananmen Square from five of the seven military regions, a larger force than had been mobilized for China's border wars with Vietnam, India, or the Soviet Union. The Nanjing Military Region, predecessor to the Eastern Theater Command, airlifted the 34th, 36th, and 110th Infantry Divisions, an artillery brigade, and an anti-aircraft battalion from the 12th Corps following Xu Qinxian's refusal to mobilize the 38th Army in Beijing. In 2017 the 12th Corps was disbanded and replaced by the 71st Group Army as China replaced their seven military regions with five theater commands.

Headquartered in Xuzhou, Jiangsu, the composition of the 71st Group Army matches the Chinese doctrinal group army structure commanding six combined-arms brigades and seven support brigades. The 71st Group Army is understood to consist of the below units. Note, the PLAGF uniquely identifies support brigades using the same unit number as the parent group army.
 Headquarters
 2nd Heavy Combined-Arms Brigade
 35th Heavy Combined-Arms Brigade
 160th Heavy Combined-Arms Brigade
 235th Heavy Combined-Arms Brigade
 178th Medium Combined-Arms Brigade
 179th Light Combined-Arms Brigade
 71st Army Aviation Brigade
 71st Artillery Brigade
 71st Air Defense Brigade
 71st Special Operations Brigade
 71st Service Support Brigade

72nd Group Army 
The 72nd Group Army, headquartered in Huzhou City, Zhejiang Province, originates from the 1930 activation of the 2nd Red Army in Hunan which took part in Mao's famous Long March. The 2nd Red Army was reorganized and redesignated as the 1st Corps in February 1947 taking an active role in the Chinese Civil War include in the battles for Shanzong, Fumei, and Longdong. In April 1953, 1st Corps was deployed to the Korean War but returned to China after only a few months with the conflict's cessation. In 2017, with the transformation of military regions to theater commands, the PLAGF 1st Corps was reorganized and redesignated as the 72nd Ground Army. The 72nd Group Army is understood to consist of the below units.
 Headquarters
 10th Heavy Combined-Arms Brigade
 5th Amphibious Combined-Arms Brigade
 124th Amphibious Combined-Arms Brigade
 85th Medium Combined-Arms Brigade
 90th Light Combined-Arms Brigade
 72nd Army Aviation Brigade
 72nd Artillery Brigade
 72nd Air Defense Brigade
 72nd Special Operations Brigade
 72nd Service Support Brigade

73rd Group Army 
The 73rd Group Army is headquartered in Bantou, Jimei District, Xiamen City, of Fujian Province – directly across the strait from Taiwan. The 73rd Group Army's history begins in 1941 with the Shantung Column of the Shangtung Military Region. Undergoing a number of restructures and redesignations throughout the 1940s, eventually to become the 31st Corps. Unlike the predecessors of the 71st and 72nd Group Armies (12th and 1st Corps) of the Eastern Theater Command, the 73rd Group Army's predecessor (the 31st Corps) was not selected to deploy in the early 1950s Korean War and remained in Fujian Province to defend the Chinese mainland against a potential US-Taiwan invasion. Later in 1958, the 31st Corps took part in the artillery bombardment of the Republic of China's Kinmen (Quemoy) and Matsu Islands precipitating the Second Taiwan Strait Crisis. As the 12th Corps and 1st Corps were reorganized and redesignated as the 71st and 72nd Army Groups in China's 2015–2017 military reforms, the 31st Corps became the 73rd Army Group. As one of two group armies in the Eastern Theater Command with amphibious combined-arms brigades, the 73rd Group has been prominently featured by Chinese media conducting amphibious landing drills in Fujian Province demonstrating its capability to take part in the use of force against Taiwan. The 73rd Group Army is understood to consists of the below units.
 Headquarters
 86th Heavy Combined-Arms Brigade
 14th Amphibious Combined-Arms Brigade
 91st Amphibious Combined-Arms Brigade
 145th Medium Combined-Arms Brigade
 3rd Light Combined-Arms Brigade
 73rd Army Aviation Brigade
 73rd Artillery Brigade
 73nd Air Defense Brigade
 73rd Special Operations Brigade
 73rd Service Support Brigade

PLA Air Force 

The Eastern Theater Command Air Force is the People's Liberation Army Air Force (PLAAF) component of Eastern Theater Command and is led by commander Huang Guoxian who took office in February 2016 and political commissar Lieutenant General Zhong Weiguo who took office in June 2019.

The PLAAF has largely disestablished divisions and converted their subordinate regiments to brigades. With only the 10th Bomber Division remaining as a division, the Eastern Theater Command Air Force is comprised of the following units.

 8th Fighter Brigade
 9th Fighter Brigade
 25th Fighter Brigade
 40th Fighter Brigade
 41st Fighter Brigade
 78th Fighter Brigade
 83rd Fighter Brigade
 85th Fighter Brigade
 95th Fighter Brigade
 10th Bomber Division
 28th Bomber Regiment
 29th Bomber Regiment
 30th Bomber Regiment
 76th Air Regiment
 77th Air Regiment
 93rd Regiment
 Unidentified drone attack brigade

PLA Navy 
 Eastern Theater Command Navy (East Sea Fleet)
 Ningbo Fleet Headquarters
 Shanghai Naval Base
 Xiangshan Naval Base
 Zhoushan Naval Base
 Fujian Naval Base
 1st Coastal Defense Brigade (Shanghai)
 2nd Coastal Defense Brigade (Shanghai)
 Coastal Defense Brigade (Fujian) 
 13th Coastal Defense Division, (Jinjiang, Quanzhou)
 31st Pontoon Bridge Brigade
PLA Naval Air Force

 1st Air Division (Shanghai)
 17th Air Regiment (Changzhou)
 5th Independent Bomber Regiment (Changzhou)
 4th Naval Aviation Brigade (Taizhou)
 11th Air Regiment (Ningbo)
 18th Air Regiment (JH-7)

PLA Rocket Force 
The People's Liberation Army Rocket Force (PLARF) component of Eastern Theater Command is Base 61 in Huangshan, Anhui. Base 61 has been regarded as the PLARF's "premier conventional base opposite Taiwan" where a number of senior PLARF leadership were likely to have been stationed. Base 61 traces its origins back to August 1965 with the establishment of Unit 121 in Guangyang Township, Shitai County which was responsible for the construction of missile silos under the PLA's Second Artillery Corps (predecessor to the PLARF) and led by Liao Changmei. PLA Rocket Force 61st Base (Huangshan City, Anhui Province) The unit was converted into the Project 303 headquarters in June 1966 and remained until 25 May 1968 when the Central Military Commission renamed the headquarters to Base 52 of the Second Artillery Corps, the PLARF component of the Nanjing Military Region (predecessor to the Eastern Theater Command). PLA Rocket Force 61st Base (Huangshan City, Anhui Province) Base 52 comprised the 807th, 811th, 815th, 817th, 818th, 819th, 820th, and 827th Brigades armed with DF-21, DF-15C, DF-15A, DF-11A, CJ-10A, and DF-21C ballistic missiles. PLA Rocket Force 61st Base (Huangshan City, Anhui Province) In 2016 the newly established PLARF took command of Base 52 which would be redesignated as Base 61 and its subordinate brigades renamed 611 to 618.

References

See also
Eastern Theater Command Air Force
Eastern Theater Command Ground Force
Eastern Theater Command Navy
Republic of China Armed Forces

 
Theater commands of the People's Liberation Army
Military units and formations established in 2016
2016 establishments in China